The Anome (alternative title: The Faceless Man) is a science fiction novel by American writer Jack Vance, first published in 1973 (copyright 1971); it is the first book in the Durdane series of novels.

Plot summary
It tells the story of a boy growing to manhood in the land of Shant, a society composed of many different, and wildly individual cantons, some of which are run by cults. Each adult wears an explosive torc which can be detonated by remote command, bringing about instant death by decapitation. The torcs are controlled by an anonymous dictator, the Anome, whose identity is literally unknown. Because those whose heads are exploded are selected primarily by the cantonal leaders, for violations of local law, the Anome is able to operate with only a handful of assistants, or 'Benevolences', who themselves do not know his identity.

See also
Wedlock, a 1991 featuring explosive collars.

References

External links
 Cover illustrations

1971 American novels
1971 science fiction novels
Novels by Jack Vance
Novels set on fictional planets
Dell Publishing books